Richard Corbett "Corby" Davis (December 8, 1914 – May 28, 1968) was an American football fullback. He was the first overall pick in the 1938 NFL Draft by the Cleveland Rams.

He spent four seasons with the Cleveland Rams, leaving pro football to enlist in the service in 1942. Corbett served as a rifleman with the Second Infantry Division in France during World War II.  He was wounded in action in 1944, and continued his service in England after recovering from his injuries.

After returning to the States, Corbett worked as an official for games in the Big Ten Conference. From 1952 until his death, he worked for the Scott Foresman publishing company.  He died while on a fishing trip in Maine in May 1968.  He lost his footing while stepping out of a boat, fell on a tree branch, and ruptured his spleen.

References

1914 births
1968 deaths
American football fullbacks
College football officials
Cleveland Rams players
Indiana Hoosiers football players
National Football League first-overall draft picks
United States Army personnel of World War II
United States Army soldiers
People from Lowell, Indiana
Players of American football from Indiana